Itk or ITK may refer to:

 ITK (gene)
 Itk, a widget toolkit for Tcl
 Innovation TK, a company acquired by Cintel in 2002
 Insight Segmentation and Registration Toolkit, abbreviated as ITK
 Kalimantan Institute of Technology (Institut Teknologi Kalimantan), a university in Indonesia